Sambhal Lok Sabha constituency is one of the 80 Lok Sabha (parliamentary) constituencies in the Indian state of Uttar Pradesh.

Assembly segments
Presently, Sambahal Lok Sabha constituency comprises five Vidhan Sabha (legislative assembly) segments. These are:

Members of Parliament

Election results

General election 2019

General election 2014

See also
 Sambhal
 Sambhal Assembly constituency
 List of Constituencies of the Lok Sabha
Sambhal News

Notes

Lok Sabha constituencies in Uttar Pradesh
Sambhal district